The Big Black is the third full-length album by British stoner metal band Orange Goblin, released in 2000 on Rise Above Records. The LP version, along with the US domestic CD, was released by The Music Cartel. In 2004, Rise Above re-released the album and included a bonus track, a cover of Black Sabbath's "Into the Void". This track is also included on the original Japanese version.

Track listing

Personnel 
 Ben Ward – vocals
 Pete O'Malley – guitar
 Joe Hoare – guitar
 Martyn Millard – bass
 Chris Turner – drums
Produced and engineered by Billy Anderson

References 

2000 albums
Orange Goblin albums
Rise Above Records albums
Albums produced by Billy Anderson (producer)